Cellole is a comune (municipality) in the Province of Caserta in the Italian region Campania, located about  northwest of Naples and about  northwest of Caserta.

Cellole borders the municipality of Sessa Aurunca, and includes the two seaside frazioni of Baia Domizia and Baia Felice facing the Gulf of Gaeta. It takes its name from the Latin pagus cellularum, indicating a rural ("pagus") series of rooms (cellulae). In the Middle Ages it was a defensive stronghold of the nearby Seassa Aurunca.

References

External links
Official website

Cities and towns in Campania